Itapemirim Transportes Aéreos S.A., also operating as Itapemirim Cargo, was a Brazilian passenger and cargo airline founded in 1990 and totally defunct in 2000.

History
Itapemirim Transportes Aéreos was founded in 1990 as an air-cargo division of Viação Itapemirim, one of the largest bus companies for passengers and cargo in Brazil. Flights started in January 1991 and operated in intermodal fashion, integrating air and land (buses and trucks) transportation. In 1996 a division for regional passenger flights was created and its flights started in 1997. However, in 1998 it was sold to TAM Linhas Aéreas. In 1999 all its cargo aircraft were sold and in 2000 the airline permanently ceased its activities.

Destinations
Itapemirim served the following cities:

Fleet
Itapemirim operated the following aircraft:

See also
List of defunct airlines of Brazil

References

Defunct airlines of Brazil
Airlines established in 1990
Airlines disestablished in 2000
1990 establishments in Brazil
2000 disestablishments in Brazil